In discrete geometry, the Erdős distinct distances problem states that every set of points in the plane has a nearly-linear number of distinct distances. It was posed by Paul Erdős in 1946 and almost proven by Larry Guth and Nets Katz in 2015.

The conjecture
In what follows let  denote the minimal number of distinct distances between  points in the plane, or equivalently the smallest possible cardinality of their distance set. In his 1946 paper, Erdős proved the estimates

for some constant . The lower bound was given by an easy argument. The upper bound is given by a  square grid. For such a grid, there are  numbers below n which are sums of two squares, expressed in big O notation; see Landau–Ramanujan constant. Erdős conjectured that the upper bound was closer to the true value of g(n), and specifically that (using big Omega notation)  holds for every .

Partial results
 by Leo Moser in 1952,
 by Fan Chung in 1984,

 by Fan Chung, Endre Szemerédi, and William T. Trotter in 1992,
 by László A. Székely in 1993,
 by József Solymosi and Csaba D. Tóth in 2001,
 by Gábor Tardos in 2003,
 by Nets Katz and Gábor Tardos in 2004,
 by Larry Guth and Nets Katz in 2015.

Higher dimensions
Erdős also considered the higher-dimensional variant of the problem: for  let  denote the minimal possible number of distinct distances among  points in -dimensional Euclidean space. József Solymosi and Van H. Vu obtained the lower bound  in 2008.

See also
Falconer's conjecture
Erdős unit distance problem

References

External links
 William Gasarch's page on the problem

Conjectures
Paul Erdős
Discrete geometry